Zambia competed in the 2010 Commonwealth Games held in Delhi, India, from 3 to 14 October 2010. Because of a lack of money, the team was cut from fifty seven athletes to twenty two.

Athletics
 Saviour Kombe
 Gift Soko
 Rachel Nachula
 Tonny Wamulwa

Badminton
 Olga Siamupangile
 Eli Mambwe
 Juma Muwowo

Boxing

 Brian Mwabu
 Precious Makina
 Martin Chibale
 Godfrey Mumba

Lawn Bowls

 Foster Banda
 Matimba Hildah

Squash
 Ray Simbule
 Lazarous Chilufua
 Kelvin Ndolvu

Swimming
 Milimo Mweetwa
 Jade Howard
 Mercedes Milner
 Mark Thompson (9)
 Zane Jordan

See also
 2010 Commonwealth Games

References

External links
 Times of India

Nations at the 2010 Commonwealth Games
Zambia at the Commonwealth Games
2010 in Zambian sport